The Göteborg class is a class of corvettes in the Swedish Navy, built between 1986 and 1993. The class was originally designed to destroy Soviet submarines and surface vessels, and is armed with eight RBS-15 anti-ship missiles, torpedoes, one 57 mm cannon, and one 40 mm cannon.

The Swedish Navy originally planned to acquire six Göteborg-class corvettes, but following the collapse of the Soviet Union in 1991, the final two were cancelled.

Two of the four corvettes built remain in service in 2021.

Gävle-class corvette 
HSwMS Sundsvall and HSwMS Gävle were modified in 2019-2020. After the modification the corvettes were shifted from Göteborg class to Gävle class, given that  had been mothballed.
 During the upgrade the corvettes received new equipment bringing them to the same standard as Visby class corvettes. This is a significant step in terms of capabilities for the class.

Units

References

External links
 Swedish Navy – Göteborgsklass. 
 Soldf.com – Korvett typ Göteborg. 

Corvette classes